A Semi-Open Game is a chess opening in which White plays 1.e4 and Black breaks symmetry immediately by replying with a move other than 1...e5. 
The Semi-Open Games are also called Single King Pawn, Asymmetrical King Pawn, or Half-Open Games (or Openings), and are the complement of the Open Games or Double King Pawn Games which begin 1.e4 e5.

Popular defenses
The most popular Black defense to 1.e4 is the Sicilian, but the French and the Caro–Kann are also very popular. The Pirc and the Modern are also commonly seen, while the Alekhine and the Scandinavian have made occasional appearances in World Chess Championship games. The Nimzowitsch is playable but rare, as is Owen's Defense.  The Borg Defense and the St. George Defense are oddities, although Tony Miles once used St. George's Defense to defeat then World Champion Anatoly Karpov.

The Sicilian and French Defenses lead to unbalanced positions that can offer exciting play with both sides having chances to win. The Caro-Kann Defense is solid as Black intends to use his c-pawn to support his center (1.e4 c6 2.d4 d5). Alekhine's, the Pirc and the Modern are hypermodern openings in which Black tempts White to build a large center with the goal of attacking it.

List
 1.e4 a5 Corn Stalk Defense
 1.e4 a6 St. George Defence
 1.e4 Na6 Lemming Defense
 1.e4 b6 Owen's Defence
 1.e4 c5 Sicilian Defense
 1.e4 c6 Caro-Kann Defense
 1.e4 Nc6 Nimzowitch Defense
 1.e4 d5 Scandinavian Defense
 1.e4 d6 2.d4 f5 Balogh Defense
 1.e4 d6 2.d4 Nf6 3.Nc3 c6 Czech Defense
 1.e4 d6 2.d4 Nf6 3.Nc3 g6 Pirc Defense
 1.e4 e6 French Defense
 1.e4 f5 Fred Defense
 1.e4 f6 Barnes Defence
 1.e4 Nf6 Alehkine's Defense
 1.e4 g5 Borg Opening
 1.e4 g6 Modern Defense
 1.e4 h5 Goldsmith Defense
 1.e4 h6 Carr Defense
 1.e4 Nh6 Adams Defense

See also
Open Game (1.e4 e5)
Closed Game (1.d4 d5)
Semi-Closed Game (1.d4 other)
Flank opening (1.c4, 1.Nf3, 1.f4, and others)
Irregular chess opening

References

Semi-Open Game
Chess terminology